Augustus C. Long (23 August 1904 – 15 November 2001) was a director of Texaco from 1950 to 1977, serving as President 1953–1956, chairman and CEO 1956–1965, and Chairman of the executive committee and CEO 1970–1971. He was also a director of Freeport Sulphur Co., Equitable Life Assurance Society of the United States, and the Federal Reserve Bank of New York.

The son of a U.S. Federal District Judge he graduated from the U.S. Naval Academy in 1926 and served at sea for four years before becoming a Texaco service station supervisor in 1930. Appointed as Texaco's marketing General Manager for Ireland in 1932 and manager for the Netherlands in 1934, he was recalled to Navy duty as a Lieutenant during World War II  coordinating petroleum supplies for the Allied forces.

External links
 Obituary

American energy industry businesspeople
1904 births
2001 deaths
Texaco people
20th-century American businesspeople
United States Navy personnel of World War II